"Torero" (Bullfighter) is a Latin pop/dance song written by Estéfano and Marcello Azevedo and performed by Puerto Rican singer Chayanne. It was released as the first single from the singer's greatest hits album Grandes Éxitos. The song became a success in Spain where it peaked at number-one. It also became a huge success in all of Latin American and the USA Latin and dance charts. It peaked number one in all of the Spanish-speaking countries.

Chart performance

Music video
A music video, directed by Pablo Croce and produced by María Inés Vélez  was shot on February 28, 2002 in Buenos Aires, Argentina. The video was nominated for Latin Grammy Award for Best Short Form Music Video losing to Frijolero by Motolov.

References

2002 singles
2002 songs
Chayanne songs
Music videos shot in Argentina
Number-one singles in Spain
Songs written by Estéfano
Sony Discos singles
Spanish-language songs